Dmitry Petrovich Kortnev (born 16 May 1989) is a Russian professional association football player.

Club career
He made his Russian Football National League debut for FC Fakel Voronezh on 4 August 2018 in a game against FC Shinnik Yaroslavl.

External links

1989 births
Sportspeople from Voronezh
Living people
Russian footballers
Association football goalkeepers
Footballers from Voronezh
FC Rubin Kazan players
FC Fakel Voronezh players